The Pennsylvania State University (Penn State or PSU) is a public state-related land-grant research university with campuses and facilities throughout Pennsylvania. Founded in 1855 as the Farmers' High School of Pennsylvania, Penn State became the state's only land-grant university in 1863. Its instructional mission includes undergraduate, graduate, professional and continuing education offered through resident instruction and online delivery. 

In addition to its land-grant designation, it also participates in the sea-grant, space-grant, and sun-grant research consortia; it is one of only four such universities. Its University Park campus, which is the largest and serves as the administrative hub, lies within the Borough of State College and College Township. It has two law schools: Penn State Law, on the school's University Park campus, and Dickinson Law, in Carlisle. The College of Medicine is in Hershey. Penn State is one university that is geographically distributed throughout Pennsylvania. There are 19 commonwealth campuses and 5 special mission campuses located across the state. The University Park campus was labeled one of the "Public Ivies" in 2001, meaning that it is a publicly funded university thought to provide a quality of education comparable to that of the Ivy League. In 2022, Penn State's research expenditures were the 22nd-highest among research universities in the United States (a total of $1.034 billion). 

Annual enrollment at the University Park campus totals more than 46,800 graduate and undergraduate students, making it one of the largest universities in the United States. It has the world's largest dues-paying alumni association. The university's total enrollment in 2015–16 was approximately 97,500 across its 24 campuses and online through its World Campus. The university offers more than 160 majors among all its campuses.

Annually, the university hosts the Penn State IFC/Panhellenic Dance Marathon (THON), which is the world's largest student-run philanthropy. This event is held at the Bryce Jordan Center on the University Park campus. In 2022, THON raised a program record of $13.7 million. The university's athletics teams compete in Division I of the NCAA and are collectively known as the Penn State Nittany Lions, competing in the Big Ten Conference for most sports. Penn State claims the most national titles of any school in the Big Ten with 52. Penn State students, alumni, faculty, and coaches have received a total of 54 Olympic medals (including 17 gold medals).

Penn State's many eminent alumni include: Fortune 500 CEOs and other corporate executives; numerous heads of state and Cabinet members; Pulitzer Prize, Grammy Award, Emmy Award, Newbery Medal, Tony Award and Academy Award winners; founders of notable companies (Sheetz, Creative Artists Agency, AccuWeather).

History

Early years 

The school was sponsored by the Pennsylvania State Agricultural Society and founded as a degree-granting institution on February 22, 1855, by Pennsylvania's state legislature as the Farmers' High School of Pennsylvania. The use of "college" or "university" was avoided because of local prejudice against such institutions as being impractical in their courses of study. Centre County, Pennsylvania, became the home of the new school when James Irvin of Bellefonte, Pennsylvania, donated  of landthe first of  the school would eventually acquire. In 1862, the school's name was changed to the Agricultural College of Pennsylvania, and with the passage of the Morrill Land-Grant Acts, Pennsylvania selected the school in 1863 to be the state's sole land-grant college. The school's name changed to the Pennsylvania State College in 1874; enrollment fell to 64 undergraduates the following year as the school tried to balance purely agricultural studies with a more classic education.

George W. Atherton became president of the school in 1882, and broadened the curriculum. Shortly after he introduced engineering studies, Penn State became one of the ten largest engineering schools in the nation. Atherton also expanded the liberal arts and agriculture programs, for which the school began receiving regular appropriations from the state in 1887. A major road in State College has been named in Atherton's honor. Additionally, Penn State's Atherton Hall, a well-furnished and centrally located residence hall, is named not after George Atherton himself, but after his wife, Frances Washburn Atherton. His grave is in front of Schwab Auditorium near Old Main, marked by an engraved marble block in front of his statue.

Early 20th century 
In the years that followed, Penn State grew significantly, becoming the state's largest grantor of baccalaureate degrees and reaching an enrollment of 5,000 in 1936. Around that time, a system of commonwealth campuses was started by President Ralph Dorn Hetzel to provide an alternative for Depression-era students who were economically unable to leave home to attend college.

In 1953, President Milton S. Eisenhower, brother of then-U.S. President Dwight D. Eisenhower, sought and won permission to elevate the school to university status as The Pennsylvania State University. Under his successor Eric A. Walker (1956–1970), the university acquired hundreds of acres of surrounding land, and enrollment nearly tripled. In addition, in 1967, the Penn State Milton S. Hershey Medical Center, a college of medicine and hospital, was established in Hershey with a $50 million gift from the Hershey Trust Company.

Modern era 

In the 1970s, the university became a state-related institution. As such, it now belongs to the Commonwealth System of Higher Education. In 1975, the lyrics in Penn State's alma mater song were revised to be gender-neutral in honor of International Women's Year; the revised lyrics were taken from the posthumously published autobiography of the writer of the original lyrics, Fred Lewis Pattee. Professor Patricia Farrell acted as a spokesperson for those who wanted the change.

In 1989, the Pennsylvania College of Technology in Williamsport joined ranks with the university, and in 2000, so did the Dickinson School of Law. The university is now the largest in Pennsylvania, and in 2003, it was credited with having the second-largest impact on the state economy of any organization, generating an economic effect of over $17 billion on a budget of $2.5 billion. To offset the lack of funding due to the limited growth in state appropriations to Penn State, the university has concentrated its efforts on philanthropy (2003 marked the end of the Grand Destiny campaign—a seven-year effort that raised over $1.3 billion).

Child sex abuse scandal 

In 2011, the university and its football team garnered major international media attention and criticism due to a sex abuse scandal in which university officials were alleged to have covered up incidents of child sexual abuse by former football team defensive coordinator Jerry Sandusky. Athletic director Timothy Curley and Gary Schultz, Senior Vice President for Finance and Business, were indicted for perjury. In the wake of the scandal, coach Joe Paterno was fired and school president Graham B. Spanier was forced to resign by the board of trustees. Sandusky, who maintained his innocence, was indicted and subsequently convicted in June 2012 on 45 counts for the abuse.

A subcommittee of the board of trustees engaged former FBI director Louis Freeh to head an independent investigation on the university's handling of the incidents. Freeh released his findings in July 2012, reporting that Paterno, Spanier, Curley, and Schultz "conceal[ed] Sandusky's activities from the board of trustees, the university community and authorities" and "failed to protect against a child sexual predator harming children for over a decade". On July 23, 2012, the National Collegiate Athletic Association announced sanctions against Penn State for its role in the scandal. The NCAA penalized Penn State football with a $60 million fine, a ban from bowl games and post-season play for four years, a reduction in scholarships from 25 to 15 per year for four years, the vacating of all wins from 1998 to 2011 and a 5-year probationary period.

The validity of the sanctions later came into question, and emails surfaced that indicated highly ranked officials within the NCAA did not believe the organization had the jurisdiction to pass down the original sanctions. Subsequent emails, brought forward under subpoena, quoted an NCAA vice-president, "I characterized our approach to PSU as a bluff when talking to Mark [Emmert, NCAA president] ... He basically agreed [because] I think he understands that if we made this an enforcement issue, we may win the immediate battle but lose the war." On September 8, 2014, the sanctions, following a report by former U.S. Senator and athletics integrity monitor George J. Mitchell citing progress by Penn State in implementing reforms, were officially repealed by the NCAA, and on January 16, 2015, all previous records were restored.

An investigation led by former U.S. Attorney General Richard Thornburgh, whom the Paterno family retained to review the Freeh report, concluded that the report that placed so much blame on Penn State and Paterno was a "rush to injustice" that could not be relied upon. He found that not only did the evidence "fall far short" of showing Paterno attempted to conceal the Sandusky scandal, but rather that "the contrary is true". In November 2014, state Sen. Jake Corman released emails showing "regular and substantive" contact between NCAA officials and Freeh's investigators, suggesting that the Freeh conclusions were orchestrated.

Death of Timothy Piazza

On February 2, 2017, Timothy Piazza, a pledge of the Beta Theta Pi fraternity located off-campus in State College, died while undergoing hazing activities at the fraternity. Eighteen members of the Penn State Beta Theta Pi fraternity were charged in connection with Piazza's death, and the fraternity was closed and banned indefinitely.

The Penn State Nittany Lions football Head Athletic Trainer played a large role in the organizing and facilitating of hazing pledges between the 2016 and 2017 academic school years.

Coronavirus
On January 24, 2020, Penn State announced it was monitoring an outbreak of COVID-19 as it had begun to spread inside of the United States. In February, Penn State restricted travel to China, Italy and Japan as well as requiring students returning from level 3 countries to be quarantined. During Spring Break, on March 11, 2020, Penn State canceled all in-person classes at its 20 campuses until at least April 3, which was later extended to the remainder of their spring and summer semesters.

Campuses

University Park 

The largest of the university's 24 campuses, University Park is located in State College borough and College Township in Centre County, near the geographic center of the state. Its dedicated ZIP code is 16802. With an undergraduate acceptance rate of 49 percent, it is the most selective campus in the Penn State system. It is one of the most selective schools in the state of Pennsylvania, according to various publications. During the fall 2018 semester, 40,363 undergraduate students and 5,907 graduate students were enrolled at University Park. Of those, 46.5 percent were female and 42.4 percent were non-Pennsylvania residents.

The University Park campus is centrally located at the junction of Interstate 99/U.S. Route 220 and U.S. Route 322, and is due south of Interstate 80. Before the arrival of the Interstates, University Park was a short distance from the Lock Haven – Altoona branch line of the Pennsylvania Railroad. The last run of long-distance trains from Buffalo or Harrisburg through Lock Haven was in 1971. Today, the nearest Amtrak passenger rail access is in Tyrone, 25 miles to the southwest. Intercity bus service to University Park is provided by Fullington Trailways, Greyhound Lines, Megabus, and OurBus. The University Park Airport, serving four regional airlines, is near University Park.

Commonwealth campuses 

In addition to the University Park campus, 19 campus locations throughout the state offer enrollment for undergraduate students. Over 60 percent of Penn State first-year students begin their education at a location other than University Park. Each of the 19 commonwealth campuses offer a unique set of degree programs based on the student demographics. Any student in good academic standing is guaranteed a spot at University Park to finish his or her degree if required or desired, known as "change of campus" or, more accurately, "the 2+2 program"; where a Penn State student may start at any Penn State campus, including University Park, for two years and finish at any Penn State the final two years.

Special mission campuses and World Campus

Special mission campuses 
 Dickinson Law, founded in 1834 as The Dickinson School of Law in Carlisle, is the oldest law school in Pennsylvania and the fifth oldest in the country. Over the years, its graduates have included the nation's finest attorneys, judges, government and corporate leaders, and legal educators. The Dickinson School of Law's 1997 merger with Penn State was completed in 2000. It expanded its reputation, network, and joint degree programs—complementing Dickinson Law's legacy as an innovative leader in experiential education. In 2006 a second campus was opened at University Park. The school was split in 2014 into two separately accredited law schools: Dickinson Law in Carlisle and Penn State Law at University Park. The last students to attend the dual-campus Penn State Dickinson School of Law graduated in May 2017.

 The Penn State Great Valley School of Graduate Professional Studies is a special mission campus offering master's degrees, graduate certification, and continuing professional education. Located in Malvern, Pennsylvania, it also offers classes at the old Philadelphia Naval Shipyard.
 Penn State College of Medicine in Hershey, Pennsylvania, is the university's medical school and teaching hospital. Penn State Milton S. Hershey Medical Center became the ninth hospital in the United States and 16th worldwide to implant the "CardioWest temporary Total Artificial Heart" when a 60-year-old man suffering from end-stage heart failure received the device in May 2008.
 Pennsylvania College of Technology, in Williamsport, Pennsylvania, offers certificates as well as degrees in over ten technical fields. Pennsylvania College of Technology became an affiliate of The Pennsylvania State University in 1989, after establishing a national reputation for education supporting workforce development, first as a technical institute and later as a community college.

World Campus 
In 1998, the university launched Penn State World Campus, or Penn State Online, which offers more than 60 online education programs, degrees, and certificates. Distance education has a long history at Penn State, one of the first universities in the country to offer a correspondence course for remote farmers in 1892. Examples of online programs include an MBA, a master of professional studies in homeland security, a Bachelor of Science in nursing, and post-baccalaureate certificates in geographic information systems and applied behavior analysis.

Organization and administration 
Penn State is a "state-related" university, part of Pennsylvania's Commonwealth System of Higher Education. As such, although it receives funding from the Commonwealth and is connected to the state through its board of trustees, it is otherwise independent and not subject to the state's direct control. For the 2006–2007 fiscal year, the university received 9.7 percent of its budget from state appropriations, the lowest of the four state-related institutions in Pennsylvania. Initial reports concerning the 2007–2008 fiscal year indicated that Pennsylvania Governor Ed Rendell is recommending a 1.6 percent increase in state appropriations. Penn State's appropriation request, submitted to the Pennsylvania Department of Education in September, requested a 6.8 percent increase in funding.

Colleges 

Penn State has eighteen colleges, including three at special-mission campuses. The University Park campus is organized into fourteen distinct colleges, plus the Graduate School and the Division of Undergraduate Studies:

In addition, the university's board of trustees voted in January 2007 to create a School of International Affairs, with the first classes admitted in the fall 2008 semester. The school is part of Penn State Law.

Formerly the School of Nursing, on September 25, 2013, the board of trustees granted the nursing program college status.

Board of trustees 

The 32-member board of trustees governs the university. Its members include the university's president, the Governor of the Commonwealth, and the state Secretaries of Agriculture, Conservation and Natural Resources, and Education. The other members include six trustees appointed by the Governor, nine elected by alumni, and six elected by Pennsylvania agricultural societies. Six additional trustees are elected by a board representing business and industry enterprises. Undergraduate students do not elect any trustees; the court case Benner v. Oswald ruled that the Equal Protection Clause of the Fourteenth Amendment did not require the undergraduate students be allowed to participate in the selection of trustees.

, the chair of the board of trustees is Keith E. Masser, a graduate of Penn State and the chairman and chief executive officer of Sterman Masser, Inc.

The board's main responsibilities are to select the president of Penn State, determine the goals and strategic direction of the university, and approve the annual budget. Regular meetings of the board are held bi-monthly and take place primarily on the University Park campus, although on occasion meetings are held at other locations within the Commonwealth.

Administration 

The university president is selected by the board and is given the authority for actual control of the university, including day-to-day management. In practice, part of this responsibility is delegated by the president to other administrative departments, the faculty, and the student body. Neeli Bendapudi became the university's 19th and current president on May 9, 2022, upon the departure of Eric J. Barron. The executive vice president and provost is the chief academic officer of the university. The current provost, Nicholas P. Jones, assumed office on July 1, 2013.

Student government 

Penn State has a long history of student governance. Elected student leaders remain directly involved in the decision-making of the university administration, as provided for in the board of trustees' standing orders. There are three student governments recognized by the university administration: the University Park Undergraduate Association (UPUA), the Graduate and Professional Student Association (GPSA), and the Council of Commonwealth Student Governments (CCSG).

The University Park Undergraduate Association (UPUA) is the representative student government of the undergraduate students at Penn State's University Park campus, which was established in 2006 after the former student government, Undergraduate Student Government (USG), lost its recognition by way of a student referendum. Graduate and professional students at the university are represented by the Graduate and Professional Student Association (GPSA), the oldest continuously existing student governance organization at Penn State.

The 19 commonwealth campuses of the university are governed by the Council of Commonwealth Student Governments (CCSG), formerly known as the Council of Branch Campus Student Governments (CBCSG).

In 2019, the World Campus Student Government Association (WCSGA) was formed to advocate for the interests and concerns of the more than 20,000 Penn State World Campus students.

Academics

Admissions

Undergraduate 

The 2022 annual ranking of U.S. News & World Report categorizes The Pennsylvania State University as "selective". For the Class of 2025 (enrolled fall 2021), Penn State received 78,578 applications and accepted 45,269 (57.6%). Of those accepted, 8,614 enrolled, a yield rate (the percentage of accepted students who choose to attend the university) of 19.0%. Penn State's freshman retention rate is 93.1%, with 85% going on to graduate within six years.

The university started test-optional admissions with the Fall 2021 incoming class in response to the COVID-19 pandemic and has extended this through Fall 2023. Of the 37% of the incoming freshman class who submitted SAT scores; the middle 50 percent Composite scores were 1200–1400. Of the 8% of enrolled freshmen in 2021 who submitted ACT scores; the middle 50 percent Composite score was between 26 and 32.

The Pennsylvania State University-University Park is a college-sponsor of the National Merit Scholarship Program and sponsored 5 Merit Scholarship awards in 2020. In the 2020–2021 academic year, 16 freshman students were National Merit Scholars.

Academic divisions

Penn State is accredited by the Middle States Commission on Higher Education. The Smeal College of Business, The Sam and Irene Black School of Business, Penn State Harrisburg, and Penn State Great Valley are accredited by the Association to Advance Collegiate Schools of Business (AACSB).

The university offers an accelerated Premedical-Medical Program in cooperation with Sidney Kimmel Medical College. Students in the program spend two or three years at the university before attending medical school at Jefferson.

Rankings 

The Academic Ranking of World Universities ranked Penn state 101–150th among universities worldwide and 42–56th nationally for 2020. U.S. News & World Report ranked the university 63rd (tie) among national universities and 23rd (tie) among public schools in the United States for 2021. In 2022, the university is ranked 96th in the QS World University Rankings. The 2021 "World University Rankings" by Times Higher Education ranked the university as the 114th best university in the world. The 2021 'Global University Ranking' by CWTS Leiden Ranking ranked the university as 52nd best university in the world, 18th in the U.S.

Research 

Penn State is classified among "R1: Doctoral Universities – Very high research activity". Over 10,000 students are enrolled in the university's graduate school (including the law and medical schools), and over 70,000 degrees have been awarded since the school was founded in 1922.

Penn State's research and development expenditure has been on the rise in recent years. For fiscal year 2013, according to institutional rankings of total research expenditures for science and engineering released by the National Science Foundation, Penn State stood second in the nation, behind only Johns Hopkins and tied with the Massachusetts Institute of Technology, in the number of fields in which it is ranked in the top ten. Overall, Penn State ranked 17th nationally in total research expenditures across the board. In 12 individual fields; however, the university achieved rankings in the top ten nationally. The fields and sub-fields in which Penn State ranked in the top ten are materials (1st), psychology (2nd), mechanical engineering (3rd), sociology (3rd), electrical engineering (4th), total engineering (5th), aerospace engineering (8th), computer science (8th), agricultural sciences (8th), civil engineering (9th), atmospheric sciences (9th), and earth sciences (9th). Moreover, in eleven of these fields, the university has repeated top-ten status every year since at least 2008. For fiscal year 2011, the National Science Foundation reported that Penn State had spent $794.846 million on R&D and ranked 15th among U.S. universities and colleges in R&D spending.

For the 2008–2009 fiscal year, Penn State was ranked ninth among U.S. universities by the National Science Foundation, with $753 million in research and development spending for science and engineering. During the 2015–2016 fiscal year, Penn State received $836 million in research expenditures.

The Applied Research Lab (ARL), located near the University Park campus, has been a research partner with the United States Department of Defense since 1945 and conducts research primarily in support of the United States Navy. It is the largest component of Penn State's research efforts statewide, with over 1,000 researchers and other staff members.

The Materials Research Institute (MRI) was created to coordinate the highly diverse and growing materials activities across Penn State's University Park campus. With more than 200 faculty in 15 departments, 4 colleges, and 2 Department of Defense research laboratories, MRI was designed to break down the academic walls that traditionally divide disciplines and enable faculty to collaborate across departmental and even college boundaries. MRI has become a model for this interdisciplinary approach to research, both within and outside the university. Dr. Richard E. Tressler was an international leader in the development of high-temperature materials. He pioneered high-temperature fiber testing and use, advanced instrumentation and test methodologies for thermostructural materials, and design and performance verification of ceramics and composites in high-temperature aerospace, industrial, and energy applications. He was founding director of the Center for Advanced Materials (CAM), which supported many faculty and students from the College of Earth and Mineral Science, the Eberly College of Science, the College of Engineering, the Materials Research Laboratory and the Applied Research Laboratories at Penn State on high-temperature materials. His vision for Interdisciplinary research played a key role in creating the Materials Research Institute, and the establishment of Penn State as an acknowledged leader among major universities in materials education and research.

The university was one of the founding members of the Worldwide Universities Network (WUN), a partnership that includes 17 research-led universities in the United States, Asia, and Europe. The network provides funding, facilitates collaboration between universities, and coordinates exchanges of faculty members and graduate students among institutions. Former Penn State president Graham Spanier is a former vice-chair of the WUN.

The Pennsylvania State University Libraries were ranked 14th among research libraries in North America in the 2003–2004 survey released by The Chronicle of Higher Education. The university's library system began with a 1,500-book library in Old Main. In 2009, its holdings had grown to 5.2 million volumes, in addition to 500,000 maps, five million microforms, and 180,000 films and videos. The university is a member of the Center for Research Libraries.

The university's College of Information Sciences and Technology is the home of CiteSeerX, an open-access repository and search engine for scholarly publications. The university is also the host to the Radiation Science & Engineering Center, which houses the oldest operating university research reactor. Additionally, University Park houses the Graduate Program in Acoustics, the only freestanding acoustics program in the United States. The university also houses the Center for Medieval Studies, a program that was founded to research and study the European Middle Ages, and the Center for the Study of Higher Education (CSHE), one of the first centers established to research postsecondary education. It is a member of the CDIO Initiative, an international network of universities working to develop unique teaching methods in engineering.

Student life

Student demographics 

As of fall 2010, the racial makeup of the Penn State system including all campuses and special-mission colleges, was 75.4 percent white, 5.5 percent black, 4.3 percent Asian, 4.4 percent Hispanic, 0.2 percent Native American, 0.1 percent Native Hawaiian/Pacific Islander, 1.7 percent two or more races, 5.8 percent international students and 3.1 percent of an unknown race. Over the period 2000–2010, minority enrollment as a percentage of total enrollments has risen 5.3 percentage points, while minorities as a percentage of total teaching positions rose 2.0 percentage points from 1997 to 2002.

Penn State has been the subject of controversy for several issues of discrimination. Following some violent attacks on African-Americans in downtown State College in 1988 and complaints that Penn State was not adequately recruiting African-American faculty and students to representative population levels, student activists occupied Old Main. They demanded that Penn State do more to recruit minority students and address intolerance toward minority students on campus and the local community.  After President Bryce Jordan canceled a promised meeting with students and organizations in the Paul Robeson Cultural Center on April 8, 1988, 250 students and activists nonviolently occupied Penn State's Telecommunications building on campus. The following morning, 50 state troopers and 45 local and campus police, equipped with helmets, batons, and rubber gloves, entered the building as the crowd outside sang "We Shall Overcome", arresting 89 individuals for trespassing. All charges were later dismissed.

In 1990 a vice provost for educational equity was appointed to lead a five-year strategic plan to "create an environment characterized by equal access and respected participation for all groups and individuals irrespective of cultural differences." Since then, discrimination issues include the handling of death threats in 1992 and 2001, controversy around LGBT issues, and the investigation of a 2006 sexual discrimination lawsuit filed by former Lady Lions basketball player Jennifer Harris, alleging that head coach Rene Portland dismissed her from the team in part due to her perceived sexual orientation.

Housing 

There are seven housing complexes on campus for students attending the University Park campus: East Halls, North Halls, Pollock Halls, South Halls, West Halls, Eastview Terrace, and Nittany Apartments. Each complex consists of a few separate buildings that are dormitories and a commons building, which has: lounges, the help desk for the complex, mailboxes for each dormitory room, a convenience store, a food court, an all-you-care-to-eat buffet. Different floors within a building may be designated as a Special Living Option (SLO). SLOs are offered to members of certain student groups (such as sororities), students studying particular majors, students who wish to engage in a particular lifestyle (such as the alcohol-free LIFE House), or other groups who wish to pursue similar goals.

Student organizations 
, 864 student organizations were recognized at the University Park campus. In addition, the university has one of the largest Greek systems in the country, with approximately 12 percent of the University Park population affiliated. Additional organizations on campus include Thespians, Blue Band, Chabad, Glee Club, Aish HaTorah, Student Programming Association (SPA), Lion's Pantry, Boulevard, Apollo, 3D Printer Club, Digi Digits, and the Anime Organization, which hosts an annual Central Pennsylvania-based anime convention, Setsucon.

THON 

Every February, thousands of students participate in the Penn State IFC/Panhellenic Dance Marathon (THON), the largest student-run philanthropy in the world. In previous years, participants stood for 48 hours nonstop and performed a line dance at least once every hour to stay alert. In 2007, THON was moved to the Bryce Jordan Center and now lasts 46 hours. THON raises millions of dollars annually for childhood cancer care and research for its sole beneficiary, Four Diamonds. In 2023, THON raised a program record of $15 million.

The Lion's Pantry 

The Lion's Pantry is an undergraduate student-run on-campus food pantry (and a registered student organization). The Lion's Pantry serves undergraduate, graduate, and professional students. With increasing awareness of hunger on college campuses, the Lion's Pantry is one of the nation's most successful startup food pantries. They partner with groups ranging from Boulevard, UPUA, Greek Life, and more to receive over 8,000 food donations a year. The club was also awarded the Class Gift of 2017 in the form of an endowment.

Public Safety 
Twenty two of Penn State's campuses are served by Penn State University Police and Public Safety. In addition to being a full-service police department, the department also has specialized units such as K9, criminal investigation, bike patrol, a bomb squad, and drones. The police department was founded in 1926 as Campus Patrol.

Penn State University Park is also served by the Penn State University Ambulance Service (Centre County Company 20). Penn State EMS is a full-service, licensed ambulance service, staffed by student EMTs. The ambulance is staffed 24/7/365 with the exception of the annual winter break when it goes out of service. The ambulance is affiliated with the University Health Service.

Student media 
Student media groups on campus include The Daily Collegian, Penn State's student-run newspaper; Onward State, a student-run blog; The Underground, a multi-cultural student media site; The LION 90.7 FM (WKPS-FM), a student-run radio station; CommRadio, a student-run, internet-based radio program; La Vie, the university's annual student yearbook; Kalliope, a student-produced literary journal; Valley, a student-run style and life magazine; Phroth, a student-run humor magazine; and Penn State Live, the official news source of the university published by its public relations team.

The Daily Collegian has continuously been ranked as one of the top college newspapers by the Princeton Review. The paper, founded in 1904, provides news, sports, and arts coverage and produces long-form features. It publishes in print on Mondays and Thursdays while classes are in session. Since the summer of 1996, the traditional paper publication has been supplemented by an online edition. Online content is published every day. Penn State's commonwealth campuses receive a weekly copy of the paper titled The Weekly Collegian.

Onward State is a student-run blog geared towards the university's community members. The blog, which was founded in 2008, provides news, event coverage, and opinion pieces. U.S. News & World Report named the blog the "Best Alternative Media Outlet" in February 2009.

The Underground is a multicultural student-run media site devoted to telling the untold stories within the Penn State community. The publication seeks to foster the multicultural student voice through creating an open forum of discussion and promoting diversity and community involvement. The media site was founded in 2015.

The LION 90.7 FM (WKPS-FM) was founded in 1995 as a replacement for Penn State's original student radio station WDFM. The LION broadcasts from the ground floor of the HUB-Robeson Center, serving the Penn State and State College communities with alternative music and talk programming, including live coverage of home Penn State football games.

CommRadio is operated by the Penn State College of Communications. It was founded in the spring of 2003 as an internet-based audio laboratory and co-curricular training environment for aspiring student broadcasters. It airs both sports coverage and news. Other programming includes student talk shows, political coverage, AP syndicated news, and soft rock music. In recent years, ComRadio broadcasters have won numerous state awards for their on-air work.

La Vie (the Life), the university's annual student yearbook, has been in production documenting student life continuously since 1890. La Vie 1987, edited by David Beagin, won a College Gold Crown for Yearbooks award from the Columbia Scholastic Press Association.

Kalliope is an undergraduate literary journal produced by students and sponsored by the university's English Department. It is published in the spring. Kalliope includes works of fiction, nonfiction, poetry, and visual art. In addition, Klio, an online publication, provides students with literary pieces in the fall semester.

Valley is Penn State's student-run life and style magazine. It was founded in 2007.

The student-run humor magazine is Phroth, which publishes two to four issues each year. Its roots date back to 1909 when it was called Froth. Several Froth writers and editors have gone on to win fame: Julius J. Epstein wrote the screenplay for the film Casablanca (1942) and won three Academy Awards; Jimmy Dugan wrote for the Saturday Evening Post, National Geographic, and The New York Times; and Ronald Bonn was a producer with NBC Nightly News and CBS Evening News.

In addition, Penn State's newspaper readership program provides free copies of USA Today, The New York Times, as well as local and regional newspapers depending on the campus location (for example, the Centre Daily Times in University Park). This program, initiated by then-President Graham Spanier in 1997, has since been instituted on several other universities across the country.

Athletics 

Penn State's mascot is the Nittany Lion, a representation of a type of mountain lion that once roamed what is now University Park. The school's official colors, now blue and white, were originally black and dark pink.  Penn State participates in the NCAA Division I FBS and in the Big Ten Conference for most sports.

Two sports participate in different conferences: men's volleyball in the Eastern Intercollegiate Volleyball Association (EIVA) and women's hockey in College Hockey America (CHA). The fencing teams operate as independents.

Athletic teams at Penn State have won 79 national collegiate team championships (51 NCAA, 2 consensus Division I football titles, 6 AIAW, 3 USWLA, 1 WIBC, and 4 national titles in boxing, 11 in men's soccer and one in wrestling in years prior to NCAA sponsorship). The 51 NCAA Championships ranks fifth all time in NCAA Division I, and is the most of any Big Ten school.

Since joining the Big Ten in 1991, Penn State teams have won 103 conference regular season and tournament titles.

Penn State has one of the most successful overall athletic programs in the country, as evidenced by its rankings in the NACDA Director's Cup, a list compiled by the National Association of Collegiate Directors of Athletics that charts institutions' overall success in college sports. From the Cup's inception in the 1993–1994 season, the Nittany Lions have finished in the top 25 every year.

Despite widespread success in the overall athletic program, the school is best known for its football team and draws a very large following. Penn State's Beaver Stadium has the second largest seating capacity of any stadium in the nation, and the 4th largest seating capacity in the world. With an official capacity of 106,572, it is slightly behind Michigan Stadium with an official capacity of 107,601. For decades, the football team was led by coach Joe Paterno. Paterno was in a close competition with Bobby Bowden, the head coach for Florida State, for the most wins ever in Division I-A (now the FBS) history. This competition effectively ended with Paterno still leading following Bowden's retirement after the 2010 Gator Bowl. In 2007, he was inducted into the College Football Hall of Fame. Paterno amassed 409 victories over his career, the most in NCAA Division I history. Paterno died on January 22, 2012, at the age of 85. Paterno was posthumously honored by Penn State during the September 17, 2016 football game that marked the 50th anniversary of his first game as head coach.

The school's wrestling team has also become noticed. Under Cael Sanderson, the Nittany Lions won eight national titles in nine years, from 2011 to 2019.

The university opened a new Penn State All-Sports Museum in February 2002. This two-level  museum is located inside Beaver Stadium.
In addition to the school-funded athletics, club sports also play a major role in the university, with over 68 club sports organizations meeting regularly. Many club teams compete nationally in their respective sports. The Penn State Ski Team, which competes as part of the United States Collegiate Ski and Snowboard Association (USCSA) in the Allegheny Conference, as well as the Penn State Swim Club, which competes in the American Swimming Association – University League (ASAU), are just a few examples. Some other clubs include baseball, squash, karate, crew, and sailing.

Penn State's most well-known athletic cheer is "We are...Penn State." Typically, the students and cheerleaders shout, "We are," followed by a "Penn State" response from the rest of the fans. By tradition, this is done three times and followed by "Thank you..." "... You're welcome!"

Notable people 
The list of eminent past and present individuals associated with Penn State—as alumni, faculty, and athletic staff—can be found in the list of Pennsylvania State University people.

Alumni association 

Established in 1870, nine years after the university's first commencement exercises, the Penn State Alumni Association has the stated mission "to connect alumni to the University and each other, provide valuable benefits to members and support the University's mission of teaching, research, and service." The Alumni Association supports a number of educational and extracurricular missions of Penn State through financial support and is the network that connects alumni through over 280 "alumni groups", many of which are designated based on geographical, academic, or professional affiliation.

As of July 1, 2010, the Alumni Association counted 496,969 members within the United States, with an additional 16,180 in countries around the globe. About half the United States alumni reside in Pennsylvania, primarily in the urban areas of Philadelphia (and the surrounding counties), the Pittsburgh Area and in the Centre County region surrounding State College, although alumni can be found in every region of the country and abroad. About 34 percent of United States alumni and 21 percent of international alumni are members of the Alumni Association. With membership totaling 176,426 as of FY2016, the Penn State Alumni Association is the largest dues-paying alumni association in the world, a distinction it has held since 1995.

Since 2001, the university, along with all schools in the Big Ten, has participated in the "Big Ten Challenge" website, which is a "competitive" clearinghouse of alumni donation statistics for member schools. Results are tracked to determine a percentage of each school's alumni from the previous decade who gave to their alma mater each calendar year (during the 2005–2006 year, alumni donations from 1996 to 2005 were tallied). With the exception of 2005–2006, when Penn State fell to second behind Northwestern University, Penn State has won the challenge each year since its inception.

See also 

Palmer Museum of Art
List of colleges and universities in Pennsylvania

Notes

References

External links 

Penn State Athletics website

 
1855 establishments in Pennsylvania
Commonwealth System of Higher Education
Educational institutions established in 1855
Forestry education
Land-grant universities and colleges
State College, Pennsylvania
Universities and colleges in Centre County, Pennsylvania